Bregenz Riedenburg railway station, also known as Riedenburg railway station, is a railway station in the town of Bregenz, the capital of the district of Bregenz in the Austrian state of Vorarlberg. It sits at the junction of the standard gauge Vorarlberg and St. Margrethen–Lauterach lines of Austrian Federal Railways (ÖBB).

Services 
The following services stop at Bregenz Riedenburg:

 Vorarlberg S-Bahn: 

References

External links 
 
 

Railway stations in Vorarlberg
Vorarlberg S-Bahn stations